In automata theory (a subfield of computer science), continuous spatial automata, unlike cellular automata, have a continuum of locations, while the state of a location still is any of a finite number of real numbers. Time can also be continuous, and in this case the state evolves according to differential equations.  

One important example is reaction–diffusion textures, differential equations proposed by Alan Turing to explain how chemical reactions could create the stripes on zebras and spots on leopards. When these are approximated by CA, such CAs often yield similar patterns. Another important example is neural fields, which are the continuum limit of neural networks where average firing rates evolve based on integro-differential equations. Such models demonstrate spatiotemporal pattern formation, localized states  and travelling waves. They have been used as models for cortical memory states and visual hallucinations.

MacLennan  considers continuous spatial automata as a model of computation, and demonstrated that they can implement Turing-universality.

See also
Analog computer
Coupled map lattice

References

Cellular automata